Paralepidocephalus is a genus of loach endemic to Yunnan, China.

Species
There are currently two recognized species in this genus:
 Paralepidocephalus translucens S. W. Liu, J. X. Yang & X. Y. Chen, 2016 
 Paralepidocephalus yui T. L. Tchang, 1935

References

Cobitidae
Fish of Asia
Fish of China